The 2008 Taça de Angola was the 27th edition of the Taça de Angola, the second most important and the top knock-out football club competition in Angola, following the Girabola. Santos Futebol Clube de Angola beat Recreativo do Libolo 1–0 in the final, to secure its 1st title.

The winner and the runner-up qualified to the CAF Confederation Cup.

Stadia and locations

Championship bracket

Preliminary rounds

Round of 16

Quarter-finals

Semi-finals

Final

See also
 2008 Girabola
 2009 Angola Super Cup
 2009 CAF Confederation Cup
 Santos FC players
 Recreativo do Libolo players

External links
 Tournament profile at girabola.com
 Tournament profile at rsssf.com

References

Angola Cup
Taca de Angola
Taca de Angola